The ARIA Streaming Chart ranks the best-performing streaming tracks of Australia. It is published by Australian Recording Industry Association (ARIA), an organisation who collects music data for the weekly ARIA Charts.

Chart history

See also
2019 in music
ARIA Charts
List of number-one singles of 2019 (Australia)

References

Australia Streaming
Streaming 2019
Number-one Streaming Songs